Carl Rodeck (13 September 1841 – 14 April 1909) was a German landscape, marine and portrait painter.

Early life and education

His father was a lithographer and, in 1842, his family moved to Hamburg to open their own shop. From 1863 to 1866, he studied under Arnold Böcklin, Ferdinand Pauwels and Alexander Michelis at the Weimar Saxon Grand Ducal Art School. After a brief return to Hamburg in 1869, prompted by his father's illness, he went to Berlin for further studies then, in 1871, went back to Hamburg, where he took up permanent residence.

Career 
After his father's death he closed the shop and devoted himself entirely to painting.

He quickly found the themes for his works; mainly oil paintings or watercolors. He portrayed the German forest, the landscape of the Lower Elbe and the old harbor neighborhood of Hamburg and was constantly on the road with a sketch pad or easel. In 1869 the  had been his first customer, and continued to buy his works throughout the 1870s. He was represented in all the major exhibitions, including Hamburg and Hanover, and later in Berlin, Dresden and Munich. He also exhibited in Vienna and London. In later years, he became increasingly interested in portrait painting.

Study trips took him to Norway. Together with his friend Carl Oesterley he visited the Netherlands, Belgium and England, where he had relatives by marriage. (His brother was the brother-in-law of the Frisian-English painter Lawrence Alma-Tadema.) As a further source of income he gave private lessons in drawing and painting for young women from Hamburg's upper classes.

Personal life 
His students included the sisters Molly Cramer and Helene Cramer, as well as his later wife Maria Hastedt (the daughter of a Hamburg architect) whom he married in 1888.

In 1907, after several strokes, he retired from painting. He died 14 April 1909 he died. His corpse was cremated, and the urn was placed at the Ohlsdorf Cemetery.

Selected works
 Angler an einem Teich im Wald (Angler at a pond in the forest), (Art Gallery and Museum, Glasgow)
 Waldlandschaft (forest landscape), 1880
 Mittagsruhe - Schafherde im Wald (Noon rest - sheep herd in the forest), 1881
 Fischerdorf in der Nähe Hamburgs (Fishing village near Hamburg), 1881
 Abend auf der Elbe unterhalb Hamburg (Evening on the Elbe below Hamburg), 1888

References
 
  (archive.org)

Footnotes

External links

 

19th-century German painters
19th-century German male artists
20th-century German painters
20th-century German male artists
Artists from Hamburg
1841 births
1909 deaths